Abiatal Avelino (born February 14, 1995) is a Dominican professional baseball infielder for the Lexington Counter Clocks of the Atlantic League of Professional Baseball. Avelino signed with the New York Yankees as an international free agent in 2011. He has played in Major League Baseball (MLB) for the San Francisco Giants.

Professional career

New York Yankees
Avelino signed with the New York Yankees as an international free agent in 2011.  He made his professional debut in 2012 with the DSL Yankees, hitting .302/.398/.374/.772 with 1 home run and 25 RBIs. He split the 2013 season between the Gulf Coast Yankees and the Staten Island Yankees, combining to hit .303/.381/.399/.780 with 23 RBIs, and was an MILB Yankees organization All Star.

He split the 2014 season between the GCL Yankees and the Charleston RiverDogs, hitting a combined .247/.308/.351/.659 with 2 home runs and 15 RBIs. He split the 2015 season between Charleston and the Tampa Yankees, hitting .260/.314/.334/.648 with 4 home runs, 27 RBIs, and 54 stolen bases in 488 at bats. His 2016 season was split between Tampa and the Trenton Thunder, combining to hit .260/.320/.364/.684 with 6 home runs and 48 RBIs.

He split the 2017 season between Tampa, Trenton, and the Scranton/Wilkes-Barre RailRiders, combining to hit .254/.304/.356/.660 with 3 home runs and 36 RBIs. In 2018, Avelino played for the Trenton Thunder of the Class AA Eastern League, with whom he was a mid-season All Star, and the Scranton/Wilkes-Barre RailRiders of the Class AAA International League, and Sacramento, and batted a combined .283/.329/.438 with 27 stolen bases in 477 at bats.

San Francisco Giants
On August 31, 2018, the Yankees traded Avelino and minor-league RHP Juan De Paula to the San Francisco Giants in exchange for Andrew McCutchen. He played three games for the Sacramento River Cats of the Triple-A Pacific Coast League, and was promoted to the major leagues on September 4, where he played six games for the Giants.

In 2019, Avelino played most of the season with Sacramento, with whom he batted .283/.315/.444 with 12 home runs, 17 stolen bases, and 62 RBIs in 473 at bats. He also had seven at bats for the Giants. He was designated for assignment on August 9, 2020. Avelino was released by the Giants organization on September 7.

Chicago Cubs
On November 20, 2020, Avelino signed a minor league contract with the Chicago Cubs organization where he was assigned to the Iowa Cubs.

Los Angeles Dodgers
On June 8, 2022, Avelino signed a minor league contract with the Los Angeles Dodgers organization. He played in Double-A with the Tulsa Drillers, appearing in 60 games and hitting .230/.288/.378 with 7 home runs, 26 RBI, and 9 stolen bases. He elected free agency following the season on November 10, 2022.

Lexington Counter Clocks
On March 14, 2023, Avelino signed with the Lexington Counter Clocks of the Atlantic League of Professional Baseball.

References

External links

Living people
1995 births
Sportspeople from San Pedro de Macorís
Dominican Republic expatriate baseball players in the United States
Major League Baseball players from the Dominican Republic
Major League Baseball infielders
San Francisco Giants players
Dominican Summer League Yankees players
Gulf Coast Yankees players
Staten Island Yankees players
Charleston RiverDogs players
Estrellas Orientales players
Tampa Yankees players
Trenton Thunder players
Cangrejeros de Santurce (baseball) players
Dominican Republic expatriate baseball players in Puerto Rico
Scranton/Wilkes-Barre RailRiders players
Gigantes del Cibao players
Sacramento River Cats players
Liga de Béisbol Profesional Roberto Clemente infielders
Iowa Cubs players
Tulsa Drillers players